Macromia flavocolorata is a species of dragonfly in the family Macromiidae. This species is widely distributed in India, Nepal, Thailand, Laos, Vietnam and China.

Description and habitat
It is a medium sized dragonfly with emerald-green eyes. Its thorax is dark metallic blue, marked with citron-yellow. There is a well-defined humeral stripe, an oblique narrow stripe on the mesepimeron, and a narrow stripe on the posterior border of the metepimeron. Abdomen is black, marked with citron-yellow. The basal half of segment 2 is yellow. Segment 3 has paired dorsal spots apposed to the basal side of jugum, and a baso-lateral triangular spot on each side. Segments 4 to 6 have the paired dorsal spots. Segment 7 has a basal annule occupying about one-third the length of segment. Segment 8 has a large triangular basal dorsal spot and a quadrate spot at the base on each side. Segments 9 and 10 are unmarked. Anal appendages are black.

This species usually found hawking over shallow streams where it breeds.

See also
 List of odonates of India
 List of odonata of Kerala

References

Macromiidae
Taxa named by Frederic Charles Fraser